"Only 4 the K People" is a bilingual (English and Italian) paperback single from The Chemical Brothers. The book features a discography, black-and-white photos, and a single titled "Terminal Tower". "Terminal Tower" is actually "Prescription Beats" from The Chemical Brothers' "Block Rockin' Beats" single, titled differently. The single is both a single and an EP.

The front cover shows a man skiing. The Loops of Fury EP of three years before also featured a man skiing on the front cover.

Track listings
 "Terminal Tower" – 5:12

1999 EPs
The Chemical Brothers songs